Maryam Yazdanfar (born 1980) is an Iranian-Swedish social democratic politician. She has been a member of the Riksdag since 2006.

External links
Maryam Yazdanfar at the Riksdag website

Members of the Riksdag from the Social Democrats
Living people
1980 births
Women members of the Riksdag
Swedish people of Iranian descent
Swedish politicians of Iranian descent
Members of the Riksdag 2002–2006
21st-century Swedish women politicians